Gah-Ndo Ashuembom Amabo (born 18 March 1991) professionally known as Gasha, is an Afro-pop, Afrobeats Soul singer from Cameroon. She made herself known in October 2013 with her debut single Kaki Mbere.

Biography 
Gasha was born in Bamenda, Cameroon in 1991 where she grew up with her parents, native of Bafut in the North West Region. She started singing at the age of 11 in high school influenced by artists such as Tracy Chapman, Sam Cooke, Jason Mraz, Richard Bona, Coldplay, Eboa Lotin, Lauryn Hill and Donny Elwood.

In 2013, she released her first single "Kaki Mbere", an Afrobeat song produced by Cameroonian music producer DiJay Pazzo. The song was a huge success and made her popular on the national and African music Scene.,

In 2014, she was awarded the best female artist for central Africa at the African Muzik Magazine Awards (AFRIMMA) in Dallas, Texas.
In 2015, she recorded Chill with Ugandan artist Eddy Kenzo.

She later collaborated with Miss Africa USA pageant for the "Women Will Change Africa" campaign and soundtrack.
The Song Gasha sings in Pidgin and English.

Discography

Singles 

 2013: Kaki Mbere
 2013: This Life
 2014: Faya di Burn feat Magasco
 2014: I notice
 2014: There he goes
 2014: The Date
 2015: Black I am feat. Stanley Enow
 2015: Women Will Change Africa (EP)
 2016: Ma kong Wa
 2016: this Life Remix feat LAW G
 2017: Back To Reality
 2017: Murder
 2017: We Still Dey feat Nabil
 2018: Le Meilleur

Awards and recognitions 

 2015: Best female artist for central Africa at AFRIMMA

References 

21st-century Cameroonian women singers
1991 births
Living people